Alexander Jonathan Gibson (born 12 August 1982) is an English former footballer who played for Port Vale, Stafford Rangers, Hednesford Town, and Droylsden.

Career
Gibson started his career with Stoke City, but moved onto local rivals Port Vale in June 2001. He made his senior debut for the "Valiants" on 10 October, in a League One 1–1 draw at Chesterfield. He went on to play 45 minutes of a Football League Trophy win over Carlisle United. He left league football at the end of the season on a free transfer to nearby Stafford Rangers.

After a spell with Hednesford Town, making 28 appearances in the 2003–04 season and featuring nine ties in the 2004–05 campaign, he signed with Droylsden at the end of the 2006–07 season. He returned to Rangers after being released by Droyslden in February 2008, but was unable to prevent their slip into the Conference North and left in August of that year.

Career statistics
Source:

References

1982 births
Living people
Footballers from Plymouth, Devon
English footballers
Association football fullbacks
Stoke City F.C. players
Port Vale F.C. players
Stafford Rangers F.C. players
Hednesford Town F.C. players
Droylsden F.C. players
English Football League players
National League (English football) players